Clotilde "Klotild" Apponyi (23 December 1867 - 1 September 1942) was an Austro-Hungarian noblewoman, women's rights activist and a diplomat.

Early life 
Apponyi was the daughter of the Austrian politician Prince Alexander von Dietrichstein-Nikolsburg and Alexandrine Aline von Dietrichstein-Proskau-Leslie (1824-1906), daughter and heiress of Joseph Franz, Prince of Dietrichstein. In 1897 she married the Hungarian politician Count Albert Apponyi de Nagy-Aponyi.

Biography 
Apponyi was president of the Klotild association for the selling of women's work from 1908, president for the alliance of Hungarian women's associations (MNSz) from 1910, board member of the Catholic protection society for women from 1913, president for the Maria Dorotea association for women teachers from 1930, as well as for numerous other charitable associations. As president of the MNSz, she addressed the Hungarian parliament in favor of women's suffrage in 1912, and supported this reform in public in 1918. After World War I, she, as president of the MNSz, became the spokesperson of the non-socialist women's associations of Hungary in oppose to the leftist MANSz under Cécile Tormay. In 1929, she protested against the suggestion to abolish women's right to run for office, and in 1939, she did the same against the suggestion to ban married women from holding office as civil servants.

During World War I, she was an informal diplomat for Hungary in Switzerland, and she served as a sub-delegate to the League of Nations in Geneva in 1928-34, and as a delegate for Hungary in 1935-37.

References 
 Francisca de Haan, Krasimira Daskalova & Anna Loutfi: Biographical Dictionary of Women's Movements and Feminisms in Central, Easterna and South Eastern Europe, 19th and 20th centuries Central European University Press, 2006

1867 births
1942 deaths
Hungarian nobility
Hungarian women's rights activists
Hungarian feminists
Hungarian philanthropists
Hungarian diplomats
Clotilde
Hungarian suffragists